Homofentanyl (N-Phenylpropylnorfentanyl, Fentanyl propyl analogue) is an opioid derivative which has been sold as a designer drug. It is a homologue of fentanyl, with similar analgesic and sedative effects but lower potency, around 14x stronger than pethidine.

See also 
 Acetylfentanyl
 Benzylfentanyl
 Butyrylfentanyl
 Isofentanyl
 Secofentanyl
 OPPPP

References 

Analgesics
Designer drugs
Opioids